Plummer Hull Harman (February 3, 1886 – November 26, 1958), known professionally as Pat Harmon, was an American film actor. He appeared in more than 130 films between 1920 and 1947.

In 1935, Harmon was the victim of a violent assault which resulted in serious facial injuries, and on August 29, 1935, he was sentenced to serve two-to-10 years in Folsom Prison after being found guilty of stealing a horse. After the incidents involved, Harmon's film career ended as he never appeared on screen again.

He was born in Lewistown, Illinois and died in Riverside, California.

Partial filmography

 In the Days of Buffalo Bill (1922)
 Riders of the Law (1922)
 The Kentucky Derby (1922)
 The Firebrand (1922)
 The Phantom Fortune (1923)
 The Shock (1923)
 The Sawdust Trail (1924)
 American Manners (1924)
 Ridgeway of Montana (1924)
 The Back Trail (1924)
 The Martyr Sex (1924)
 Hot Water (1924)
 S.O.S. Perils of the Sea (1925)
 Barriers Burned Away (1925)
 The Lure of the Wild (1925)
 Fighting Youth (1925)
 The Phantom Bullet (1926)
 College Days (1926)
 The Unknown Cavalier (1926)
 The Barrier (1926)
 The Cowboy Cop (1926)
 Sin Cargo (1926)
 Breed of the Sea (1926)
 Winning the Futurity (1926)
 Josselyn's Wife (1926)
 The Bachelor's Baby (1927)
 Snowbound (1927)
 The Haunted Ship (1927)
 Hazardous Valley (1927)
 Lightning (1927)
 The Warning (1927)
 The Sideshow (1928) 
 Court Martial (1928)
 Waterfront (1928)
 Sal of Singapore (1928)
 The Broken Mask (1928)
 Sunset Pass (1929)
 Tide of Empire (1929)
 Spite Marriage (1929)
 Small Talk (1929)
 Berth Marks (1929)
 Dark Streets (1929)
 See America Thirst (1930)
 Two-Gun Caballero (1931)
 Secret Menace (1931)
 Malay Nights (1932)
 Battling Buckaroo (1932)
 Another Wild Idea (1934)
 Border Vengeance (1935)
 The Last of the Clintons (1935)
 Trails End (1935)
 Five Bad Men (1935)

References

External links

1886 births
1958 deaths
American male film actors
American male silent film actors
Male actors from Illinois
20th-century American male actors
People from Lewistown, Illinois